During the 2001–02 English football season, Wigan Athletic F.C. competed in the Football League Second Division.

Background

In the 2000–01 season, Wigan finished in the playoffs for the third consecutive season, but once again missed out on promotion, losing in the play-off semi finals to Reading. Following the sudden departure of manager Steve Bruce at the end of the season, Paul Jewell was appointed as his replacement.

Transfers
Following the departures of several players from the previous season, Jewell spent heavily in the summer in an attempt to build a squad capable of gaining promotion. 

Shortly before the transfer deadline, Wigan signed Nathan Ellington for a club record transfer fee of £1.2 million.

At the end of the season, defender Arjan de Zeeuw turned down a new contract at the club and left on a free transfer to join First Division side Portsmouth.

In

Out

Loans in

Loans out

League

Wigan Athletic's league season started on 11 August 2001, with a 1–1 draw against Brentford. The season started poorly, and only the team's away form kept them out of the relegation zone. Despite the club's poor results, chairman Dave Whelan publicly backed manager Paul Jewell, and blamed the previous two managers for the club's current position.

Results improved following a 6–1 win against Stoke City in November, and the club eventually finished in a mid-table position.

Results
Wigan Athletic's score comes first

Legend

Final league table

Cups

FA Cup

Wigan played at home against non-league club Canvey Island in the first round of the FA Cup. Wigan lost 1–0, and had two players sent-off during the game. The result was considered one of the biggest upsets of the round.

League Cup

Football League Trophy

Wigan suffered a heavy defeat in the first round of the Football League Trophy, losing 1–5 against Wrexham. Manager Paul Jewell later recalled that chairman Dave Whelan confronted the players after the game, informing them that Jewell would be staying at the club and that the players would be held accountable if results did not improve.

Squad statistics
Squad at end of season

Appearances and goals

|-
|colspan="14"|Players who appeared for Wigan and left during the season:

|}

References

Wigan Athletic F.C. seasons
Wigan Athletic